EVC may refer to:

 Eastern Valley Conference, a defunct American high school athletics conference
 Ecological vegetation class
 Economic value to the customer
 Eden Village Camp, a Jewish summer camp in New York state
 Electric Vehicle Company
 Ellis–van Creveld syndrome
 Enchanted Valley Carnival, an Indian music festival
 Entravision Communications, an American media company
 Essential Video Coding, video coding standard
 Ethernet virtual connection
 European Video Corporation
 European Vital Computer, in the European Train Control System
 EVC (gene)
 Evergreen Valley College
 Everybody Votes Channel a channel for the Nintendo Wii
 VESA Enhanced Video Connector